A pistonless rotary engine is an internal combustion engine that does not use pistons in the way a reciprocating engine does. Designs vary widely but typically involve one or more rotors, sometimes called rotary pistons. Although many different designs have been constructed, only the Wankel engine has achieved widespread adoption.

The term rotary combustion engine has been used as a name for these engines to distinguish them from early (generally up to the early 1920s) aircraft engines and motorcycle engines also known as rotary engines. However, both continue to be called rotary engines and only the context determines which type is meant, whereas the "pistonless" prefix is less ambiguous.

Pistonless rotary engines
A pistonless rotary engine replaces the linear reciprocating motion of a piston with more complex compression/expansion motions with the objective of improving some aspect of the engine's operation, such as: higher efficiency thermodynamic cycles, lower mechanical stress, lower vibration, higher compression, or less mechanical complexity.  the Wankel engine is the only successful pistonless rotary engine, but many similar concepts have been proposed and are under various stages of development. Examples of rotary engines include:

Production stage
Wankel engine
LiquidPiston engine
 Beauchamp Tower's nineteenth century spherical steam engine (in actual use as a steam engine, but theoretically adaptable to use internal combustion)

Development stage
Engineair engine
Hamilton Walker engine
 Libralato rotary Atkinson cycle engine
Quasiturbine
RKM engine, 
Sarich orbital engine
Trochilic engine
Wave disk engine
 Nutating disc engine

Conceptual stage
Gerotor engine
 Integrated Supersonic Component Engine

See also
 Range extender (vehicle)

Further reading 
 Jan P. Norbye: 'Rivals to the Wankel: A Roundup of Rotary Engines', Popular Science, Jan 1967, pp 80–85. 
 Article referencing the October 1964 issue of Mechanix Illustrated and the AMC/Rambler rotary

 
Proposed engines
Engine technology

ar:محرك فانكل